The 7th Rhythmic Gymnastics Asian Championships was held in Jecheon, South Korea from 10 - 13 June 2015.

Medal winners

Medal table

Results

Details

References

External links

Rhythmic Gymnastics Asian Championships
International gymnastics competitions hosted by South Korea
2015 in gymnastics  
2015 in South Korean sport  
Jecheon